Renaissance Child is the solo debut album by rapper Hell Razah, released on February 20, 2007 through Nature Sounds Records. Razah is most famed as a member of Wu-Tang Clan affiliate groups Sunz of Man and Black Market Militia. The album features production from MF Doom, Dev 1, Shuko, Fabrizio Sotti and Wu-Tang affiliate producers Bronze Nazareth and 4th Disciple. Album guests include Tragedy Khadafi, Timbo King, R.A. the Rugged Man, Talib Kweli, Viktor Vaughn, Killah Priest, Ras Kass and The Maccabeez. The track "Renaissance" was originally released on the Nature Sounds compilation album Natural Selection. The album's lead single was "Buried Alive" b/w "Project Jazz". It was released February 2007. The album has moved 4,506 units. The First 10,000 Units Contain a Limited Edition Bonus DVD directed by Apademik, and co-directed by Hell Razah.

Track listing

Album singles

References 

2007 albums
Hell Razah albums
Nature Sounds albums
Albums produced by Bronze Nazareth
Albums produced by MF Doom